7300 or variant, may refer to:

In general
 A.D. 7300, a year in the 8th millennium CE
 7300 BCE, a year in the 8th millennium BC
 7300, a number in the 7000 (number) range

Places
 7300 Yoshisada, an asteroid in the Asteroid Belt, the 7300th asteroid registered
 7300 (District of Pogradec), one of the postal codes in Albania
 7300 Observatory, Cloudcroft, New Mexico, USA

Radio
 ICOM IC-7300 amateur radio transceiver

Rail
 Hankyu 7300 series electric multiple unit train class
 Hokuso 7300 series electric multiple unit train class
 Tobu 7300 series electric multiple unit train class
 Yurikamome 7300 series train class

Other uses
 IBM 7300, a hard disk drive unit

See also